Valhalla is an afterlife "hall of the slain" in Norse mythology.

Valhalla may also refer to:

Places

United States
 Valhalla (Marathon), a neighborhood within the city of Marathon, Florida
 Valhalla, New York, a hamlet and census-designated place
 Valhalla (Poolesville, Maryland), a home listed on the National Register of Historic Places
 Valhalla Canyon, in Wyoming
 Lake Valhalla, Washington
 Woden - The Valhallas, mountains in Olympic National Park

Elsewhere
 Mount Valhalla (Antarctica)
 Valhalla, suburb in Centurion, South Africa
 Valhalla Provincial Park, in British Columbia, Canada
 Valhalla, neighborhood established in Palestine in the 19th-century by German Templers, now part of the Tel Aviv-Yafo municipal area
 Valhalla (crater), on Jupiter's moon Callisto

Arts and entertainment
 Valhalla (comics), a Danish comic book series
 Valhalla (audio drama), a 2007 Doctor Who audio play
 "Valhalla", a short story by Gregory Benford about the possible fate of Adolf Hitler
 Valhalla, a sci-fi novel and trilogy (with Ragnarök and Guðsríki) by Ari Bach
 Valhalla, a novel by Tom Holt

Film and television
 Valhalla (1986 film), Danish animated feature film
 Valhalla (2013 film), american/Canadian skiing and snowboarding adventure film 
 Valhalla (2019 film), Danish dark fantasy adventure film
 Vikings: Valhalla, a Netflix series in production as at late 2020 (a spin-off from the Vikings TV series)
 "Valhalla", TV series episode, see list of Beastmaster episodes
 "Valhalla", TV series episode of Criminal Minds (season 6)
 "Valhalla", TV series episode of Deadliest Catch
 "Valhalla", TV series episode, see list of The Last Man on Earth episodes
 "Valhalla", TV series episode of The Umbrella Academy
 The Valhalla Murders is a 2020 eight-episode police procedural television series produced in Iceland

Games
 Valhalla, a 1983 ZX Spectrum game
 Valhalla: Before the War, a 1995 Amiga game
 Assassin's Creed Valhalla, a 2020 action-adventure RPG
 An alternate name forRagnarok, a 1992 MS-DOS game
 Valhalla, a story location in Final Fantasy XIII-2
 VA-11 HALL-A, a 2016 bartending simulation game developed by Sukeban Games
 Valhalla, a multiplayer map in Halo 3

Music
 "Valhalla", a song by Pantera from their 1985 album I Am the Night
 "Valhalla", a song by Crimson Glory from their 1986 album Crimson Glory
 "Valhalla", a song by Blind Guardian from their 1989 album Follow the Blind
 "Valhalla", a song by Black Sabbath from their 1990 album Tyr
 "Valhalla", a song by Manowar from their 2002 album Warriors of the World
 "Valhalla", a song by Týr from their 2006 album Ragnarök
 "Valhalla", a song by Erra from their 2018 album Neon
 "Valhalla", a song by Skegss from their 2021 album Rehearsal
 "Valhalla", a song by Thirty Seconds to Mars
 "Valhalla", a song by Elton John

Businesses
 Valhalla Cinema, Melbourne, a defunct arthouse movie theater in Melbourne, Australia
 Valhalla Entertainment, an American television and film production company best known for producing The Walking Dead
 Valhalla Game Studios, a video game development, entertainment and holding company founded in Tokyo
 Valhalla Golf Club, a private golf club in Louisville, Kentucky

Schools
 Valhalla High School (New York), Valhalla
 Valhalla High School (California), El Cajon

Transportations
 , a Royal Navy destroyer
 Valhalla (steam yacht, 1892)
 Aston Martin Valhalla, an upcoming mid-engine sports car developed by Aston Martin

Other uses
 Valhalla (Blackpool Pleasure Beach), a thrill ride at Blackpool Pleasure Beach
 Valhalla Memorial Park Cemetery, a cemetery in North Hollywood, California
 Valhalla Swimming Hall, a swimming hall in Gothenburg, Sweden
 Valhalla IP, a football stadium in Gothenburg, Sweden
 Valhalla station, a railroad station serving Valhalla, New York
 The Valhalla train crash, a 2015 derailment of a commuter train near that station that killed six.
 Valhalla Museum, a museum of ship's figureheads in Tresco Abbey Gardens, Isles of Scilly, England
 Valhalla (youth portal), the Nordic Council of Ministers’ portal for children and youth culture in Scandinavia
 Project Valhalla (Java language), an experimental OpenJDK project to develop major new language features
 Codename of Red Hat Linux 7.3
 Valhalla power supply, an upgrade to the original Linn Sondek LP12 turntable, made standard in 1982

See also
Valhall (disambiguation)
Walhalla (disambiguation)